Nagorny is a rural locality (a settlement) and the administrative center of Nagornoye Rural Settlement, Petushinsky District, Vladimir Oblast, Russia. The population was 807 as of 2010. There are 12 streets.

Geography 
Nagorny is located 17 km west of Petushki (the district's administrative centre) by road. Pokrov is the nearest rural locality.

References 

Rural localities in Petushinsky District